Mukkula is the 7th district of the city of Lahti, in the region of Päijät-Häme, Finland.

The population of the statistical district of Mukkula was 4,262 in 2019.

References 

Districts of Lahti